Kenneth Peter Kravec (born July 29, 1951) is an American professional baseball scout and a former Major League pitcher and front office official. The ,  left-hander appeared in 160 games pitched, 128 as a starter, exclusively for the White Sox (1975–80) and the Cubs (1981–82).

Kravec graduated from Midpark High School, Middleburg Heights, Ohio, played college baseball at Ashland University, and was selected by the White Sox in the third round (69th overall) of the 1973 Major League Baseball draft. He was promoted to the White Sox in September 1975 after posting a record of 14–7 and an earned run average of 2.41 and was named to the Double-A Southern League's all-star team.  In his Major League debut on September 4, he started against the Kansas City Royals but lasted only 2 innings, giving up only one hit but allowing seven bases on balls and three earned runs, taking the loss in a 7–1 Kansas City win.

After the White Sox signed free agent catcher Carlton Fisk during the 1980–81 offseason, Fisk found that Kravec was sporting the No. 27 uniform the future Hall of Famer had previously worn with the Boston Red Sox. As a result, Fisk reversed the digits and would wear No. 72 during his 13-year career with Chicago. Both numbers have been retired by their respective teams. Ironically, Kravec was traded to the Cubs (the crosstown rivals of the White Sox) for right-hander Dennis Lamp on March 28, 1981, just a few weeks into Fisk's tenure with the club.

All told, Kravec allowed 814 hits and 404 bases on balls in 858 Major League innings pitched, with 557 strikeouts, six shutouts, 24 complete games, and one save. His one save came on May 9, 1979, when he recorded the final out of the game to nail down a 5-4 victory over the Tigers. 

He remained in baseball after his active career ended as a scout for the Royals, Florida Marlins, Cubs and Tampa Bay Rays.

References

External links
, or Retrosheet, or Venezuelan Professional Baseball League statistics

1951 births
Albany A's players
Ashland Eagles baseball players
Baseball players from Cleveland
Bradenton Explorers players
Chicago Cubs executives
Chicago Cubs players
Chicago Cubs scouts
Chicago White Sox players
Fort Myers Royals players
Fort Myers Sun Sox players
Iowa Cubs players
Iowa Oaks players
Kansas City Royals scouts
Knoxville Sox players
Living people
Llaneros de Portuguesa players
Major League Baseball pitchers
Miami Marlins scouts
Tampa Bay Rays scouts
Tiburones de La Guaira players
American expatriate baseball players in Venezuela